Julia is the Polish soap opera. It is broadcast on weekdays on TVN since Monday, January 2, 2012. The pilot episode was broadcast on Friday, December 23, 2011, after the final episode of Prosto w serce (Straight Into the Heart).

Plot 
The series follows the fortunes of young girl called Julia Chmielewska, who the day before his wedding decides to start all over again and moves out of her hometown to Kraków. Staying with her cousin Katarzyna and her family. In the picturesque town meets a rich Janicki family, who are the owners of Beauty Clinic.

Cast

External links 
Julia at IMDb
Official profile in Filmpolski.pl database

2012 Polish television series debuts
2012 telenovelas
Polish television soap operas
TVN (Polish TV channel) original programming